USS Antilla was a United States Navy cargo ship in commission from 1918-1919.

SS Antilla was built as a commercial cargo ship at West Hartlepool, England, by William Gray & Company. The U.S. Navy acquired her for World War I service from the New York and Cuba Mail Steamship Company on 14 May 1918 and commissioned her on 20 May 1918 at Hoboken, New Jersey as USS Antilla.

Attached to the Naval Overseas Transportation Service, Antilla made two voyages to Europe while in commission, but spent much of the rest of her time in commission undergoing repairs. She was decommissioned on 20 February 1919 and returned to the New York and Cuba Mail Steamship Company.

Unlike most commercial ships commissioned into U.S. Navy service during World War I, Antilla never received a naval registry Identification Number (Id. No.).

References

External links
 NavSource Online: Section Patrol Craft Photo Archive: Antilla

Ships built on the River Tees
1903 ships
Cargo ships of the United States Navy
World War I auxiliary ships of the United States
World War I cargo ships of the United States